The Kol language is a language spoken in eastern New Britain island, Papua New Guinea. There are about 4000 speakers in Pomio District of East New Britain Province, mostly on the southern side of New Britain island.

Kol appears to be a language isolate, though it may be distantly related to the poorly attested Sulka language or form part of the proposed East Papuan languages.

Phonology 
Phonology of the Kol language:

/b, r/ can be realized as [β, d] as intervocalic allophones. /r/ is pronounced as [d] when following a nasal consonant.

Kol displays vowel length contrast.

Vocabulary
The following basic vocabulary words are from SIL field notes (1962, 1981), as cited in the Trans-New Guinea database:

{| class="wikitable sortable"
! gloss !! Kol
|-
| head || ˈkel.a; kela keřne
|-
| hair || ˈkomɒ; komɔʔ kalɛane
|-
| ear || ˈbula; bula kɛřlɛ
|-
| eye || pelnɛl; ˈpenel
|-
| nose || taˈli:; tali keřne
|-
| tooth || ˈmire; mi̠řɛ kɛřnɛ
|-
| tongue || dal kɛřnɛ; raal
|-
| leg || pe:re
|-
| louse || ˈtare; ta̠řɛ
|-
| dog || kuˈɒ:; kwa
|-
| pig || bu
|-
| bird || ˈule; ulɛ
|-
| egg || ˈkondola; kondo̠la
|-
| blood || ˈbe:la
|-
| bone || ˈti:le
|-
| skin || tomalu gomo; toˈmolu
|-
| breast || ˈtombo; to̠to la̠nɛ
|-
| tree || ˈti:nel; ti̠nɛl
|-
| man || mo; tɒ: ˈti:niŋ
|-
| woman || daiƀɛ; ra:l
|-
| sun || ˈkarege; kařɛ̠qɛ
|-
| moon || ˈigu; i̠qu
|-
| water || ˈgonu; qu̠nu
|-
| fire || kuˈoŋ; kuɔŋ
|-
| stone || ˈlela; lɛla
|-
| road, path || kɛrɛa; ˈkeria
|-
| name || ˈole
|-
| eat || mo raŋ kal oŋ; tam·a
|-
| one || ˈpusuɒ; titus
|-
| two || tɛřɛŋ; teˈtepe
|}

See also
 East Papuan languages

References

External links
Kol language word list at TransNewGuinea.org

East Papuan languages
Language isolates of New Guinea
Languages of East New Britain Province